The Texas Longhorns men's basketball program is a college basketball team that represents the University of Texas in the Big 12 Conference in the National Collegiate Athletic Association. The team has seen 25 individuals hold the head coach position since its inception in 1906. The current head coach is Rodney Terry, who was named interim head coach when Chris Beard was suspended in December 2022 after being arrested on a domestic violence charge. Beard was fired in January 2023.

Over the history of the Texas basketball program, only 1 coach has been enshrined in the National Collegiate Basketball Hall of Fame. The all-time wins leader is Rick Barnes, having won 402 games over his 17-year tenure at the University of Texas.

Key

Bold= Leader in each category

Coaches

Notes

References

Lists of college men's basketball head coaches in the United States
 
Texas Longhorns basketball coaches